Sidney Poitier (1927–2022) was an actor and director. He was best known for his groundbreaking and trailblazing work in the 1950s and 1960s. His breakthrough performances in film include The Defiant Ones (1958), Porgy and Bess (1959), A Raisin in the Sun (1961), Paris Blues (1961),  Lilies of the Field (1963), A Patch of Blue (1965), To Sir, with Love, In the Heat of the Night and Guess Who's Coming to Dinner (all 1967).

Filmography

Actor

Director

Television

References 

American filmographies
Male actor filmographies